This is a list of episodes of ITV sitcom George and Mildred.

Series overview

Episodes

Series 1 (1976)

Series 2 (1977)

Series 3 (1978)

Series 4 (1978)

Series 5 (1979)

Film version

Following the fifth series, a feature film version of the series was produced in 1980. The film was not written by Cooke and Mortimer but by Dick Sharples. The Fourmiles only played a small role in the film, which focused on George and Mildred celebrating their wedding anniversary, at Mildred's insistence, at an upmarket London hotel. It featured several guest stars including Stratford Johns, Kenneth Cope and Vicki Michelle. The film was neither a critical nor box office success. It was shown on ITV on Christmas Day 1980.

The end

The final caption of the George and Mildred film read "The End - or is it the beginning?" It was to prove to be the former as Yootha Joyce died from portal cirrhosis of the liver due to chronic alcoholism on 24 August 1980, before the film was released. Friends and colleagues were unaware that Joyce had been habitually consuming half a bottle of brandy every day for over 10 years.

In 2004, on an audio commentary on the Australian Umbrella DVD release of George and Mildred: the Complete Series 2, Brian Murphy revealed that there had been plans for a sixth series of eight episodes of the show. These were to have been recorded in late 1980. Murphy also revealed that this was due to have been the final series of George and Mildred, as he and Yootha Joyce were afraid of being typecast after playing the characters since 1973 on television and in two films. However, despite scripts being written, Joyce's hospitalisation and subsequent death brought a premature end to the show. Her funeral took place on the day the cast were due to begin rehearsals for the new series. Speaking of their relationship in a 2001 ITV programme, The Unforgettable Yootha Joyce, Murphy said that when they had first met at Joan Littlewood's Theatre Workshop he had, "always regarded Yootha as very stylish and very confident. I was rather over-awed by her at first, full of admiration for her. "At her death, "People said, 'You've lost a working partner' and I said, 'No, I've lost a chum'... and then I realised I've lost my working partnership as well...".

Thames Television did consider producing a spin-off for the character of George, looking at him cope with life as a widower. However, this project did not materialise, though Brian Murphy did reunite with George and Mildred co-star Roy Kinnear and writers Johnnie Mortimer and Brian Cooke for The Incredible Mr Tanner, a comedy produced by Thames Television in 1981.

References

External links

ITV-related lists
Lists of British sitcom episodes